Hillas Hut is a heritage-listed historic hut at Hillas Creek, Adelong, Cootamundra-Gundagai Regional Council, New South Wales, Australia. It was added to the New South Wales State Heritage Register on 2 April 1999.

History 

Hillas Hut is a timber slab hut on Yabtree Station dating from prior to 1835. It was built from local materials. James Hillas, the son of owner John Hillas, was murdered in the hut in 1835. It was used as a blacksmith's workshop after 1859. It forms part of the Yabtree Farm complex today.

Heritage listing 
Hillas Hut was listed on the New South Wales State Heritage Register on 2 April 1999.

See also

References

Attribution 

New South Wales State Heritage Register
Articles incorporating text from the New South Wales State Heritage Register
Adelong
Huts in Australia